This is a list of notable people who have had bulimia nervosa. Often simply known as bulimia, this is an eating disorder which is characterized by consuming a large amount of food in a short amount of time, followed by an attempt to rid oneself of the calories consumed, usually by self-induced vomiting, laxatives, diuretics or excessive exercise. Eating disorders are known to be more common in people whose occupations involve significant focus on appearance, like athletes or celebrities.

Music
Paula Abdul, American singer
Lily Allen, British singer-songwriter
Melanie C, Spice Girls singer
Lady Gaga, American singer
Geri Halliwell, Spice Girls singer
Elton John, British musician
Demi Lovato, American singer and actor
Katharine McPhee, American singer
Alanis Morissette, Canadian-American musician
Tove Lo, Swedish musician
Shelby Starner, American singer-songwriter 
Lynda Thomas, Mexican musician
Amy Winehouse, British singer-songwriter (1983–2011)

Other
Russell Brand, British comedian 
Candace Cameron Bure, American actress and producer
David Coulthard, British Formula One racing driver
Katie Couric, American television journalist
Diana, Princess of Wales, British royal family, (1961–1997)
Michelle Duggar, American reality television star on 19 Kids and Counting
Jocelyn Golden, author
Marya Hornbacher, American author
John Prescott, British politician
Richard Simmons, American fitness instructor and television personality
Shane Dawson,  American YouTube personality
Bryony Gordon, English journalist
Freddie Flintoff, British cricketer 
Jane Fonda, American actress
Camila Mendes, American actress 
Zoe Kravitz, American actress
Lily Collins, American actress
Lindsay Lohan, American actress
Richa Chadha, Indian actress
David Von Erich, American Professional Wrestler (1958-1984)
Jaiden Animations, American YouTube personality

See also 
 List of people with anorexia nervosa

References

Eating disorders
Lists of people by medical condition